Jian (also Romanized as Jīān) is a village in Dehqanan Rural District, in the Central District of Kharameh County, Fars Province, Iran. At the 2006 census, its population was 297, in 75 families.

References 

Populated places in Kharameh County